Alpha-gal syndrome (AGS) (also Alpha-gal allergy; Mammalian meat allergy (MMA)) — is a type of meat allergy characterized by a delayed onset of symptoms (3–8 hours) after ingesting mammalian meat. The condition results from past exposure to certain tick bites. It was first reported in 2002. Symptoms of the allergy include rash, hives, nausea or vomiting, difficulty breathing, drop in blood pressure, dizziness or faintness and severe stomach pain.

Alpha-gal allergy is a reaction to the carbohydrate galactose-alpha-1,3-galactose ("alpha-gal"), whereby the body is overloaded with immunoglobulin E (IgE) antibodies on contact with the carbohydrate. Anti-gal is a human natural antibody that interacts specifically with the mammalian carbohydrate structure gal alpha 1-3Gal beta 1-4GlcNAc-R (the alpha-galactosyl epitope). The alpha-gal molecule is found in all mammals except catarrhines (apes and Old World monkeys), the taxonomic branch that includes humans.

Bites from specific tick species, such as the lone star tick (Amblyomma americanum) in the US, and the paralysis tick (Ixodes holocyclus) in Australia, which can transfer this carbohydrate to a victim, have been implicated in the development of this delayed allergic response to consumption of mammalian meat products (“red meat”). Healthcare providers recommend avoiding food products containing beef, pork, lamb, venison, rabbit and offal to avoid triggering an allergic reaction. Some afflicted individuals are so hypersensitive to alpha-gal that the allergy can cross-react with mammalian gelatin and even some dairy products. Individuals with alpha-gal allergy do not need to become strict vegetarians because reptile meats, poultry and seafood naturally do not contain alpha-gal.

Alpha-gal allergy has been reported in 17 countries on all six continents where humans are bitten by ticks, particularly the United States and Australia. As of November 2019 Australia has the highest rate of mammalian meat allergy and tick anaphylaxis in the world. In the US, the allergy most often occurs in the central and southern regions, which corresponds to the distribution of the lone star tick. In the Southern United States, where the tick is most prevalent, allergy rates are 32% higher than elsewhere. However, as doctors are not required to report the number of patients with alpha-gal allergy, the true number of affected individuals is unknown. Alpha-gal has also been shown to exist in the saliva of Ixodes scapularis but not Amblyomma maculatum.

Alpha-gal allergies are the first known food allergies that present the possibility of delayed anaphylaxis. It is also the first known food-related allergy associated with a carbohydrate, rather than a protein. Other mammalian products containing alpha-gal other than meat such as milk and gelatin may also trigger an allergic reaction.

Symptoms
A typical allergic reaction to alpha-gal has a delayed onset, occurring 3–8 hours after the consumption of mammalian meat products, in contrast to the typical rapid onset of most food allergies. After the delayed onset, the allergic response is like most food allergies, and especially an IgE-mediated allergy, including severe whole-body itching, hives, angioedema, gastrointestinal upset, and possible anaphylaxis. In 70% of cases, the reaction is accompanied by respiratory distress and as such is particularly harmful to those with asthma. However, not every exposure to alpha-gal results in allergic reaction for some people with the allergy.

Cause

Alpha-gal allergies develop after a person has been bitten by the lone star tick in the United States, the European castor bean tick, the paralysis tick or Ixodes (Endopalpiger) australiensis in Australia, Haemaphysalis longicornis in Japan, or a currently unknown tick in South Africa, possibly Amblyomma hebraeum. Alpha-gal is not naturally present in apes, Old World monkeys, or humans, but is in all other mammals. If a tick feeds on another mammal, the alpha-gal remains in its alimentary tract. The tick then injects the alpha-gal into a person's skin, which causes the immune system to release a flood of IgE antibodies to fight the foreign carbohydrate. Researchers still do not know which specific component of tick saliva causes the reaction. Only a small percentage of children and adults will acquire a red meat allergy after receiving a bite from a lone star tick.

A 2012 preliminary study found unexpectedly high rates of alpha-gal allergy in the Western and North Central parts of the United States. This suggests that unknown tick species may spread the allergy. The study even found alpha-gal allergy cases in Hawaii, where no ticks identified with the allergies live. Human factors were suggested, but no specific examples were provided.

Alpha-gal is present in the anticancer drug cetuximab, as well as the intravenous fluid replacements Gelofusine and Haemaccel. Blood thinners derived from porcine intestine and replacement heart valves derived from porcine tissue may also contain alpha-gal.

At least one instance of a man with an alpha-gal allergy going into anaphylaxis after receiving a heart valve transplant has been reported. Some researchers have suggested that the alpha-gal in pig's tissue that surgeons use for xenografts might contribute to organ rejection.

Mechanism
Recent research has shown that saliva from the lone star tick contains alpha-gal, and that saliva is injected into the blood stream. The immune system then releases IgE antibodies to fight this foreign sugar. After this reaction, the future intake of mammalian meat with the same alpha-gal causes an allergic reaction. Symptoms of the allergy reaction are caused by too many IgE antibodies attacking the allergen  the alpha-gal.

Diagnosis
A traditional skin-prick allergy test for allergy to meat may give a false-negative answer. Determination of specific IgE to alpha-gal testing is commercially available, as well as IgE testing to specific red meats. Skin and basophil activation tests with cetuximab are the most sensitive, but high costs limit their use.

Prognosis
There is no cure for alpha-gal; the main form of management is abstaining from red meat and other mammalian products if necessary. If an allergic individual who only experiences relatively mild symptoms consumes a food containing alpha-gal then treatment with over-the-counter antihistamines may be acceptable. Unlike most food allergies, in some people, the alpha-gal allergy may recede over time, as long as the person is not bitten by another tick. The recovery period can take 8 months to 5 years.

Desensitization 
So far, only two successful desensitizations have been performed on patients with an alpha-gal allergy.

Prevention and tick removal 

Tick bites can be prevented by treating clothing and gear with products containing 0.5% permethrin and by avoiding areas inhabited by ticks.

Debate exists around the best method of tick removal although recent consensus is to freeze them with an ether-containing spray (available at pharmacies and used for warts).

History

The allergy was first formally identified as originating from tick bites in the United States in 2002 by Thomas Platts-Mills, and independently by Sheryl van Nunen in Australia in 2007.

Platts-Mills and Scott Commins were attempting to discover why some people were reacting negatively to the carbohydrate in the cancer drug cetuximab. They had previously hypothesized that a fungal infection or parasite could lead to the allergy. When Platts-Mills was bitten by a tick and developed alpha-gal allergies, his team came to the conclusion that  a link existed between tick bites and the allergy. They found that the IgE antibody response to the mammalian oligosaccharide epitope, alpha-gal, was associated with both the immediate-onset anaphylaxis during first exposure to intravenous cetuximab and the delayed-onset anaphylaxis 3 to 6 hours after ingestion of mammalian food products, such as beef or pork.

In 2021 University of Tennessee's Entomologist Becky Trout Fryxell reported that more cases of Alpha-Gal syndrome are occurring from those who encounter the Lonestar Tick: " "She likes to feed on dogs, deer and seems to always find people as well," said Fryxell "It has the ability to transmit a lot of pathogens too. And it's also associated with a tick meat allergy which unfortunately is becoming pretty common." "

Van Nunen, an immunologist specialising in allergies, had been practicing in a tick-prone area of Sydney, when 25 patients reported having allergic reactions to red meat after being bitten by ticks. She later concluded that the relatively sudden rise in cases was the result of a local fox baiting program which began in 2003. Foxes were introduced to Australia and had decimated the local indigenous bandicoot population, hence the fox baiting program. However an unforeseen effect of the subsequent rise in the bandicoot population was the rise in ticks, as bandicoots are a major host for ticks, and thus the number of humans suffering tick bites.

Alpha-gal allergies are similar to pork–cat syndrome, hence mis-identification can occur.  Pork–cat syndrome usually elicits an immediate allergic response, while a true alpha-gal allergy typically features a delayed allergic reaction of 3 to 8 hours after ingestion of the allergen.

In 2020 the U.S. Food and Drug Administration approved genetic modification of pigs so they do not produce alpha-gal sugars. Pigs developed with the trademarked name GalSafe may be able to be eaten safely by people with alpha-gal allergy. They may also produce alpha-gal-safe drugs, and their organs can also be used for xenotransplantation.

See also 
 Poultry allergy
 Pork–cat syndrome

References

Further reading 
 
 

Allergology
Food allergies